End Credits is the debut EP by Irish electronic musician Eden. It was released worldwide on 8 August 2015 through both his own label MCMXCV, as well as UK based label Seeking Blue Records. The album was produced and recorded in Dublin during spring 2015  and contains seven tracks spanning approximately 26-minutes. The tracks of the EP have accumulated more than 14 million plays in total on SoundCloud.

Background and recording
Production of End Credits began in Dublin after Jonathon changed his alias from The Eden Project to Eden. It was written and recorded between April and July 2015. Irish vocalist Leah Kelly is featured on the title track.

Artwork
Each track on End Credits features individual cover art that uses photography by JSaulsky Photo. The artwork follows a camera-film format throughout and depicts railroad tracks near American neighborhoods.

Track listing
All songs were composed by Jonathon Ng.

Personnel
Jonathon Ng - guitar, drums, vocals, piano, sound design, production, mixing, engineering, programming, string arrangement
Leah Kelly - vocals (track 2)

References

2015 EPs
Eden (musician) EPs